An Asian fetish is a strong sexual preference for people of Asian descent or heritage. The term generally refers to people of East or Southeast Asian descent, though this may also include those of South Asian descent.

The derogatory term yellow fever is sometimes used to describe the fetishisation of East Asians by people of other ethnicities, especially among non-Asians, as well as having a preference for dating people of East Asian origin. The usage of "yellow" stems from the color terminology for race that is sometimes applied to people of East Asian descent.

History of origins 

In the United States, women of East and Southeast Asian descent are sometimes stereotyped as subservient, passive, mysterious, villainous in nature, and hyper-sexual. Such stereotypes are widely accepted as the driving factor behind the fetishization of Asian women in the West. Although few authors agree on the origin of Asian fetishism, Celine Parreñas Shimizu has argued that the corresponding stereotypes of Asian women in the United States emerged after United States-led wars in Asia. 

It is important to uncover the history of these cultural stereotypes and their relationship to pop culture in order to begin to examine their implications in the 21st century. Harmful stereotypes of Asian women in America influenced the first U.S. immigration law based on race, the Page Act of 1875, preventing Chinese women from entering the United States. These women were feared to lack moral character, were assumed to engage in prostitution, and were viewed as having a seductive and corrupting influence on white males. However, according to John Moore and other historians, the main purpose of the ban was to limit the reproduction of the Chinese working class in America. At the same time, the coercive opening of treaty port cities in China, Japan, and Korea as a result of Western imperialism created a trade route to feed demand for Oriental art and collectibles, which often depicted sexualized geishas. In Cornel West's book, Race Matters, he describes negative depictions of Asian Americans from "bad" to "good" to "bad" depending on the political climate at that time.

There were several other stereotypes of Asian women in American popular culture, such as the evil Asian villain or as the pathetic "Madame Butterfly" who could be cast aside at a moment's notice unless she commits suicide afterward as her lover leaves her. The "good" Asian women were those who are subservient to the white protagonist against her own people, while often giving her body to him in the process. "David Henry Hwang points out, the neocolonial notion that good elements of a native society, like a good woman, desire submission to the masculine West speaks precisely to the heart of our foreign policy blunders in Asia and elsewhere".

After World War II, the U.S. came to dominate among Western powers and accordingly exerted a strong military presence in Korea and Vietnam. The U.S. military took control of several Japanese military-run brothels in anticipation that their soldiers would need to "blow off steam" and encouraged engaging with prostitutes as a way to boost morale. Coupled with the poverty of local women, this created a booming sex industry, which further perpetuated the stereotype of Asian women as submissive and hypersexual. As a result of these sexual exploitations we see films such as Year of the Dragon (1985) Tracy Tzu is an Asian American news reporter and is given the impression that she is a smart young professional, but is then eventually manhandled and dominated by a white GI 'hero'. She is then overpowered and carried off to bed as if she is nothing but a trophy. As Richard E. Lee points out, Tzu's ambivalent position as both object of desire and seductive destroyer of the family is redeemed only by her collaboration with the White man and her ultimate devotion to him. These cinematic stereotypes of Asian women portray them as eager to please the man that owned them and something to be desired or conquered. All of which have contributed to the misconception of Asian women even today, contributing to the subconscious, and dehumanizing thinking that may lead to sexual assault upon them. Coming back to the U.S. from the Korean and Vietnam Wars, American G.I.s brought home women as war brides, contributing to the perception of Asians as passive trophies and victims without agency. Popular media reflected such views of Asian women being promiscuous yet in need of saving, from pornography featuring sexually and domestically servile Asian war brides, to novels like Greene's The Quiet American, to Kubrick's film Full Metal Jacket.

Terminology and usage of Yellow fever 
A common term used for Asian fetishization (particularly with East and Southeast Asians) is yellow fever. The term was notably used in from the afterword to the 1988 play M. Butterfly by David Henry Hwang, the afterword being written by the writer of the play. The term is used as a derogatory pun on the disease of the same name, comparing Caucasians with a fetish for East and Southeast Asians or "Orientals" to people who are infected with a disease.

Yellow fever is used in Asian fetishization to refer to the color terminology of people of East Asian descent (and some South-East Asians), as historically, persons of East Asian heritage have been described as "yellow people" based on the tone of their skin.

Hwang argues that this phenomenon is caused by the stereotyping of Asians in Western society. The term yellow fever is analogous to the term jungle fever, a derogatory expression used for racial fetishism associated with dating between different races.

Racial preferences 
A 1995 study found that men generally rated Asian American and Hispanic American women as more attractive than white American and African-American women, and that this seemed to correlate with physical attributes shared between the Asian and Hispanic women. However, these authors also said that it would be inaccurate to conclude that any ethnic group was more attractive than another, using only their experiment.

In 2007, after a two-year study on dating preferences among 400 Columbia University students, researchers did not find evidence of a preference among White men for women of East Asian descent. The study implied that most people preferred to date within their own race. However, the study also noted that 47% of all hookups were inter-racial, with the majority being White male-Asian female pairings. This was attributed to the neutrality of the Asian women who participated. According to Matthew Johnson, the participants in this study consistently made decisions that contradicted their stated preferences.

A 2013 study, which used a sample of 2.4 million online interactions, found that black, white and Hispanic men preferred Asian women. A 2018 study using a sample of 187,000 daters found that Asian women were the most desired women.

Psychological effects 

Yellow Fever is known as a modern phenomenon in the realm of dating. Based on responses from a few Asian ethnic groups, the yellow fever phenomenon has created a psychological burden on people of East and Southeast Asian descent. They have been reported to experience doubt and suspicion that men who find them attractive may be primarily attracted to their ethnic features and culture rather than their personal traits or characteristics. People that are the targets of these racial fetishes may have experiences associated with feelings of depersonalization. The fetishized body of the East or Southeast Asian woman becomes a symbol of other people's desires; she may not be valued for who she is, but what she has come to represent. Racial depersonalisation can be especially hurtful to these women in situations where being recognized as an individual is important, such as non-sexual romantic relationships, because a person may feel unloved if they sense they could be replaced by someone with similar qualities.

Another effect of this fetish is that it may cause its targets to feel like an Other, because they are isolated and held to different standards of beauty. Asian American women report being complimented in ways that imply they are attractive because of their Asian ancestry. Because of this perceived Asian fetish, Asian American's ethnic and cultural differences are either seen as a failure to conform to mainstream Western standards of beauty, or as something that can be appreciated only on an alternative scale. This can cause insecurity, and affect a woman's self-worth and self-respect.

Men with a preference for women of East or Southeast Asian descent may also affected by the stigma of their perceived fetish. In Robin Zheng's view, these men may be seen as inferior by others, because of the stereotype about the feminine superiority of Asian women, which reduces the status of Asian women to objects that are only valuable for sex and not as complete human beings. However, according to social research by Kumiko Nemoto, white men with Asian women do not experience any social stigma, and are even envied by other men, because of a shared cultural notion that Asian women are highly desirable. However, couples involving Asian men paired with white women did experience significant social hostility.

It has been argued that the notion of an Asian fetish creates the unnecessary and erroneous perception of multiracial relationships as being characterized by "patriarchal, racist power structures" in relationships. However, research conducted by Kumiko Nemoto has found that second-generation Asian women in interracial relationships with white men often earn more money and have higher education than their partners. She also found that Asian women view these relationships as less patriarchal and more egalitarian.

Some research has sought to determine how the mainstream American culture might affect Asian-American body satisfaction.
Several studies say that Asian women are more satisfied with their bodies than white women, while others say they have comparable levels of dis-satisfaction.

Connection to violence 
The Atlanta spa shootings in 2021 sparked debate around the effects of Asian fetish, with many popular and scholarly sources agreeing that the shooting is part of a long legacy of American imperialist violence against Asia projected onto Asian women and female Asian bodies.

In 2002, a study showed that though Asian women were underrepresented in popular media, they are over-represented in victim roles in violent pornography. However, more recent research has found that Asian women are actually much less likely to be treated aggressively in pornography than the other races of women, and that Asian women are less objectified, as well. Yet, Asian women did have less agency in porn. This is consistent with a Lotus Blossom stereotype of excessive femininity for Asian women in pornography.

Interracial marriages 
A 1998 article in The Washington Post states that 36% of young Asian Pacific American men born in the United States married White women, and 45% of U.S.-born Asian Pacific American women took White husbands during the year of publication. In 2008, 9.4% of Asian American men married to White American women while 26.4% of Asian American women were married to White American men. 7% of married Asian American men have a non-Asian spouse, 17.1% of married Asian American women are married to a White spouse, and 3.5% of married Asian men have a spouse classified as "other" according to U.S. census racial categories. 75% of Asian/White marriages involve an Asian woman and a White man. There was a spike in White male, Asian female marriages during and following the U.S. Army 's involvement with wars in Asia, including WWII, Korea, and Vietnam. In 2010,  219,000 Asian American men married White American women compared to 529,000 White American men who married Asian American women.

Since the beginning of the twentieth century, the Westerner's image of the Asian woman has been seen as subservient, loyal, and family oriented.

After World War II, particularly feminine images of Asian women made interracial marriage between Asian American women and White men popular. Asian femininity and White masculinity are seen as a sign of modern middle-class manhood. Postcolonial and model minority femininity may attract some White men to Asian and Asian American women and men see this femininity as the perfect marital dynamic.  Some White men racialize Asian women as "good wives" or "model minorities" because of how Asian women are stereotyped as being particularly feminine.

In preparation for a documentary on Asian fetish called Seeking Asian Female, Chinese-American filmmaker Debbie Lum interviewed non-Asian men who posted online personal ads exclusively seeking Asian women. Things that the men reported finding appealing in Asian women included subtlety and quietness, eye-catching long black hair, a mysterious look in dark eyes, and a propensity to give more consideration to how their partner feels than to themselves. Lum characterized the stereotype associated with an Asian fetish as an obsession with seeking "somebody submissive, traditional, docile... the perfect wife who is not going to talk back".

Asian women may be viewed by White men with Asian fetish as "good wives", as in they are perceived to be able to properly take care of their children during the day and fulfill their partner's sexual desires at night. In interviews done by Bitna Kim, "Caucasian" men explain their fetish for Asian women. The Caucasian men interviewed fantasize that an Asian woman possesses both beauty and brains, that she is "sexy, intelligent, successful, professional, caring, and family oriented"; that she does not wear "White girl clothes" and heavy makeup, and that they are not high maintenance. Hence, the men believe that Asian women have respectable mannerisms. These men see Asian women to be exotic, thus desirable, because of their supposed mysterious beauty and possession of a physical appearance perceived to be petite. Sexually, the men in these interviews had a commonality. They all believed that Asian women have submissive sex. They believed that an Asian woman did not mind putting her partner's pleasure above hers. These interviews show that some "Caucasian" men with Asian fetish believe that an Asian woman embodies a perfect wife as a "princess in public and a whore in the bedroom".

Since 2002, marriages between Swedish men and Thai women have become increasingly common.

Historically, the number of Thai women marrying Western men began to rise in the 1950s and 1960s as a result of Prime Minister Sarit Thanarat's economic policies which attracted foreign investment and Western men to Thailand. There is a social stigma in the country against Thai women marrying White men, who are also referred to as farang (a term used for people of European origin), but research published in 2015 indicated that an increasing number of young middle-class Thai women were marrying foreign men. A generation earlier, Thai women marrying foreign men had mostly been working class.

Sources indicate that Sri Lanka is popular among Western "marriage bureaus" which specialize in the pairing of men who were "Europeans, North Americans and other westerners" with foreign women. The first and largest wave of Sri Lankan immigrants to Denmark were Sinhalese women who came to the country in the 1970s to marry Danish men they had met back in Sri Lanka. Statistics also show that marriages of Danish, Swedish and Norwegian men with Thai or Indian women tend to last longer than those of Indian men marrying Danish, Swedish or Norwegian wives.

Filipina, Thai, and Sri Lankan women have traveled as mail-order brides to Europe, Australia, and New Zealand.

Statistics detailing the sponsorship of spouses and fiancées to Australia between 1988/1989 and 1990/1991 showed that more women from the Philippines, Singapore, Malaysia, Sri Lanka, Vietnam, Indonesia, South Korea, and India were sponsored for citizenship than men from the same countries.

Data published in 1999 indicated that an estimated 200,000 to 400,000 German men annually travelled abroad for sex tourism, with the Philippines, Thailand, South Korea, Sri Lanka and Hong Kong as their main destinations. For some White men, sex tourism to countries such as Thailand is built around a fantasy that includes the possibility of finding love and romance. This idea is based on the stereotype of "the Oriental woman" who is considered to be beautiful and sexually exciting as well as caring, compliant and submissive.

In mainstream media 
There are relatively few representations of Asian people in Western media. Asian women in the media tend to be portrayed in two ways: as an exotic foreigner, docile and nonthreatening and sexual but also innocent; or as the nerd who is still aesthetically pleasing, but also emotionless and career-oriented. This leads many Asian women to believe that they have to be in one of these boxes. It tends to convey the message that if they are smart, they cannot be sexual; or, if they are sexual, they tend to not be aware of it. By the late 2010s, movies such as Crazy Rich Asians and The Farewell began to break these boundaries, but they are movies that center around the Asian experience, allowing for more diversity across Asian characters.

In her essay "Hateful Contraries: Media Images of Asian Women", British filmmaker Pratibha Parmar comments that the media's imagery of Asian women is "contradictory" in that it represents them as "completely dominated by their men, mute and oppressed" while also showing them as "sexually erotic creatures".

In her essay Lotus Blossoms Don't Bleed: Images of Asian Women, American filmmaker Renee Tajima-Peña identifies two basic stereotypes of Asian women in the United States.. The "Lotus Blossom Baby" is a feminine and delicate sexual-romantic object. In contrast, the "Dragon Lady" is treacherous and devious, and in some cases, a prostitute or madam. Tajima suggests that this view of Asian women contributes to the existence of the Asian mail-order bride industry in the US.

Pornography 
Several studies have implied that Asian women are over-represented in the American pornography industry. Asian women make up perhaps 20% of all female performers, despite being roughly 2.5% of the U.S. population. Asian men also appear to be considerably over-represented, at 10% of male actors.

It is argued that media may be furthering the progression of the Asian woman stereotype. This can be seen in movies, where the women are characterized by submissiveness. This trend is embodied within pornography, which focuses on an Asian women's stereotyped body type and her ability and desire to remain submissive to men.  Asian pornography arose at a time when the United States government banned prostitution. But in other Asian countries, porn was supported, which lead to the accumulation and sexualization of Asian-based porn in the United States.  The inability for one to truly understand another culture or production opens up more room for imagination and fantasy which eventually leads to fetishization.

In 2021, Pornhub's most searched terms were hentai, Japanese, and Asian. Jennifer Lynn Gossett and Sarah Byrne conducted a content-analysis study of 32 pornographic websites that advertised scenes depicting the rape or torture of women and found that nearly half of the sites used depictions of 34 images depicted Asian women as victims of rape, while 24 images of white women could be found. No images of black women being raped could be found. However, according to Emily Rothman, more recent research suggests that Asian women are treated less aggressively than other races of women in American pornography, and are even less objectified, but also have less agency in scenes than the other women.

See also 

 Amejo
 Asian Babes – UK pornographic magazine
 Asian Fever – U.S. pornographic magazine
 
 Ethnic pornography
 Japanophilia
 Miscegenation
 Orientalism
 Tiger mom
 Race and sexuality
 Sarong party girl
 Stereotypes of South Asians
 Sexualization and sexual exploitation in K-pop
 Yellow cab

References

Further reading

External links

 Seeking Asian Female − a documentary by Debbie Lum (official website)
 Seeking Asian Female page at PBS Independent Lens

Asian studies
Asian-American issues
Admiration of foreign cultures
Sexual slang
Intercultural and interracial relationships
Sexual fetishism